Massey Harris Lofts is a loft condominium in Liberty Village area of downtown Toronto, Ontario, Canada. The building is the former head office of Massey-Harris Limited, later known as Massey Ferguson, a large agricultural implements manufacturer. It is the last building remaining from a large factory complex that Massey-Harris operated on King Street West from the 1870s until the 1980s.

History

Built in 1899 by well known Toronto architect E.J. Lennox, the Richardsonian Romanesque building is located at 915 King Street West and served as head office for Massey Harris (formed in 1891 from the merger of Massey Manufacturing Company of Toronto and Alanson Harris, Son and Company Limited of Brantford and later Massey Ferguson), part of a large  complex.

By the late 1970s, the head office building had become vacant, as the company used office space downtown. The surrounding manufacturing complex, which at one time employed 9,000 workers, began scaling down its operations, moving manufacturing to Brantford, Ontario leaving only a small-scale operation. After closing the plant completely in October 1982, Massey Ferguson started making plans for a mixed-use development of its manufacturing lands. Under therThe head office building was to have a community space on the first floor, with residences above. The Massey Harris lands were rezoned to permit a new "high-tech zone" south of King, and residences to the north. After rezoning, The remaining complex was sold in 1988 to Counsel Property Corp for $52 million. However, by 1990, the real estate market crashed and ownership reverted to the mortgage holder, Canadian Imperial Bank of Commerce (CIBC), which had intended to build a data centre on the lands.

CIBC cancelled its plans for a data centre on the property, leaving the redevelopment stalled. The terms of the rezoning agreements were revised, dropping the high tech zone, permitting the head office building to become fully residential. Residential uses were now permitted on all of the former industrial lands. The head office building was converted into the Massey Harris Lofts after 2002. The four-floor structure was converted in 2003 for residential use. The other M-F buildings including the plant were demolished.

Massey Harris Park is located next to the lofts.

References

Bibliography
 

Residential condominiums in Canada
Residential buildings in Toronto
E. J. Lennox buildings